Summer '89 was a various artists "hits" collection album released in Australia in 1988. The album spent 2 weeks at the top of the Australian album charts in December 1988 / January 1989.

Track listing
"Two Strong Hearts" - John Farnham
"The Only Way Is Up" - Yazz and the Plastic Population
"Never Tear Us Apart" - INXS
"Bad Medicine" - Bon Jovi
"Sexy Girl" - Sabrina
"Wild, Wild West" - The Escape Club
"Hold On To Me" - The Black Sorrows
"So Excellent" - Kylie Mole
"A Groovy Kind of Love" - Phil Collins
"You Came" - Kim Wilde
"Sweet Child o' Mine" - Guns N' Roses
"As the Days Go By" - Daryl Braithwaite
"Fallen Angel" - Poison
"I Quit" - Bros
"Touch" - Noiseworks
"I Want Your Love" - Transvision Vamp
"If I Could" - 1927
"Oh Yeah" - Yello

Charts

References

1988 compilation albums
Pop compilation albums